The Central Sports Complex Stadium is a stadium in Ryazan, Russia. The Central Sports Complex Stadium opened in 1980 and was formerly the home of the now defunct local football teams FC Spartak-MZhK Ryazan and FC Ryazan. It is currently the home of FC Zvezda Ryazan. The CSC Stadium was most recently refurbished in 2008, and is now a 25,000 capacity all-seater stadium, with a running-track for athletics.

Gallery

References

www.fussballtempel.net

External links
photos @fussballtempel.net

Football venues in Russia
Sport in Ryazan
Buildings and structures in Ryazan Oblast
1980 establishments in Russia
Sports venues completed in 1980